Linden Farm, also known as Linden and Dew House, is a historic home located near Farnham, Richmond County, Virginia. It was built in two stages between about 1700 and 1725, and is a small -story Colonial era frame vernacular dwelling.  It is clad with beaded weatherboards and has an asymmetrical gable roof.  The house features tall, asymmetrical, pyramidal brick chimneys.

It was added to the National Register of Historic Places in 1977.

References

External links
Linden Farm, Lancaster Road, Warsaw, Richmond, VA: 1 photo at Historic American Buildings Survey

Historic American Buildings Survey in Virginia
Houses on the National Register of Historic Places in Virginia
Houses completed in 1725
Colonial architecture in Virginia
Houses in Richmond County, Virginia
National Register of Historic Places in Richmond County, Virginia
1725 establishments in Virginia